Hopitsewah is a former Pomo settlement in Lake County, California. It was located on the west shore of Clear Lake; its precise location is unknown.

It was visited by Joseph Warren Revere in the mid-1840s; Revere reported it to be the largest of the settlements on Clear Lake, with enclosed and cultivated lands.

References

Former settlements in Lake County, California
Former Native American populated places in California
Lost Native American populated places in the United States
Pomo villages